American Eagle (Jason Strongbow) is a Navajo superhero appearing in American comic books published by Marvel Comics.

Publication history
American Eagle first appears in Marvel Two-in-One Annual #6 (October 1981), by writer Doug Moench and penciler Ron Wilson. In the story entitled "An Eagle from America!" Strongbow gains superhuman powers and becomes American Eagle. He joins with Thing, Ka-Zar, and Wyatt Wingfoot to defeat Klaw.

The character subsequently appears in Contest of Champions #1, 3 (June & August 1982), Incredible Hulk (vol. 2) #279 (January 1983), and Rom #65-66 (April 1985-May 1985). He makes several appearances in stand-alone stories in Marvel Comics Presents including issues #27 (September 1989), 128 (May 1993), 130 (June 1993), and 147-148 (February 1994). The story "Just Another Shade of Hate", in issue #27, is its first solo adventure.

The American Eagle is not seen again for some time until his appearance in Thunderbolts #112-115 (May 2007-August 2007) where the writer Warren Ellis and the artist Mike Deodato Jr gave him a new look. American Eagle appears in his own digital comic on Marvel Digital Comics Unlimited published Nov. 12, 2008. Titled American Eagle: Just a Little Old-Fashioned Justice, it is an eight-page story written by Jason Aaron with art by Richard Isanove. This eight-page digital story was later printed in Marvel Assistant-Sized Spectacular #1 (2009). He plays a big role in the story "Homeland" in War Machine (vol. 2) #6-7 (2010) written by Greg Pak. He appears in Heroic Age: Heroes #1 (November 2010) and Fear Itself: The Home Front #5 (October 2011).

American Eagle received an entry in the original Official Handbook of the Marvel Universe #1, in the Official Handbook of the Marvel Universe Deluxe Edition #1, in The Marvel Encyclopedia (2009) and in the Official Handbook of the Marvel Universe A To Z Update #2 (2010).

Fictional character biography
Jason Strongbow is a member of the Navajo Nation who was born in Kaibito, Arizona. He attempted to stop a mining company from excavating a mountain sacred to his tribe. He discovered that the villain Klaw was in league with the mining company. Klaw needed uranium to augment his sonic powers. Strongbow's brother Ward did not agree with him about preserving the mountain. Inside the mine, an argument erupted between the brothers and Klaw which led to violence. During the fight, Klaw used his sonic blaster on the two brothers. Somehow, a combination of the sonic energy of the blast and the exposure to the uranium gave both of the Strongbow brothers enhanced physical abilities. Klaw fled with his crew and Ward to the Savage Land in hopes of gaining vibranium to augment his powers.

Jason emerged from the mine. Taking inspiration from a flying eagle, he took up the mantle of American Eagle. He followed Klaw to the Savage Land. There, he met Ka-Zar, Thing, and Wyatt Wingfoot. The four joined forces and defeated Klaw and his minions. During the battle, Ward was shot and killed by one of the miners.

American Eagle returned to become a champion of his tribe, subsequently identified as the Navajo Nation. Since his battle with Klaw in the Savage Land, he was among the heroes of the world gathered to take part in the Contest of Champions, he was among the heroes who gathered to honor the Hulk, and he was among the heroes who helped Rom the Spaceknight defeat the Dire Wraiths.

In his first solo adventure, the American Eagle defeated the Peace Monger and his Knights of Saint Virgil in Washington, D.C. With the NYPD, American Eagle arrests his cousin Jimmy Littlehawk who - along with two friends - robbed a casino on the Reservation then left for New York City. He helped F.B.I. agent Dale Peck arrest Jonas Murphy, a mutant and a serial killer. With Detective Frank Ramirez, Strongbow stopped a drug ring led by a man named Sinner, who used children to sell his merchandise. Strongbow escaped execution by John Marshall, who stole land from Native Americans man and was later ruined through a real estate charge by American Eagle. With the help of Interpol, Strongbow lured Marshall and his soldiers into a trap.

After the 2006 "Civil War" storyline, Jason Strongbow confirms to his friend Steve Rogers that he is strongly against the Super-Human Registration Act, and is planning to fight Iron Man over it. He also bears a new costume with fewer stereotypically Native American attributes, including a leather jacket and a helmet resembling the head and beak of a bald eagle. It is his intent to prevent the Steel Spider from direct confrontation with an angry group of men from Jason's Navajo reservation by persuading the Steel Spider to ease up on his zealous vigilante act. By talking to Ollie, he hopes to defuse a time bomb of local violence just waiting to explode.

The Eagle finds the Steel Spider in downtown Phoenix, Arizona, as the Thunderbolts unexpectedly arrive. Ollie argues that they will try to kill him and replace him with "Some Good Government Worker". When the Thunderbolts eventually do emerge, Jason decides to ally himself with Steel Spider, shooting the team's leader, Moonstone, through the wrist with a crossbow bolt. After a prolonged fight, Sepulchre becomes involved, and the three defeat Venom, the Swordsman, Songbird, and Radioactive Man. Though the latter two wish to try to defeat them using the old team's methods, leaving Sepulchre and the Eagle, Moonstone orders that Bullseye cripple the Eagle in the same way he did Jack Flag. The issue ends with Songbird, Radioactive Man, Penance and Venom squaring up against Steel Spider, Sepulchre and Jason, in what Steel Spider describes as 'almost ... a fair fight'. The Eagle ends up crippling Bullseye before making his escape.

A news reporter stated that because American Eagle lives on a Native American Reservation he is exempt from the Registration Act, and that the Commission on Superhuman Activities would take no action against him because of this.

During the 2008-09 "Dark Reign" storyline, it is revealed that Jason is hiding James Rhodes' mother inside the Navajo County. Norman Osborn later tries to convince him to subdue War Machine, besides he has no jurisdiction over Strongbow. Jason refuses to act for anyone other than the interests of the Navajo and fights together with War Machine against a "Giant Ultimo Head" Rhodes stumbled upon along the way to find the men behind the "Ultimo Virus" deployed in Acquiria.

During the 2011 "Fear Itself" storyline, American Eagle deals with the fear and chaos in Bleachville as well as drug traffickers and the town's mayor.

American Eagle later appears as a member of the Agents of Wakanda.

Powers, abilities and equipment
American Eagle possesses superhuman strength, enabling him to lift (press) approximately 15 tons under optimal conditions. He also possesses superhuman speed, agility, stamina, and sturdiness as a result of radiation-induced mutation. Strongbow's bodily tissues are somewhat harder and more resistant to physical injury than that of an ordinary human. However, he is far from invulnerable. While he can be injured by weapons composed of conventional materials, he can withstand impact forces that would severely injure or kill a normal human with little to no injury to show for it. He can run at a maximum speed of 65 miles per hour for approximately 5 hours before tiring to an appreciable degree.

American Eagle's sensory organs have also been fortified by the radiation-induced mutation. His senses of hearing, smell, taste, and touch are approximately three times that of an average human being.

He also carries a crossbow which fires special bolts.

Analysis 

In Native Americans in Comic Books - A Critical Study, Michael A. Sheyahshe notes that while American Eagle "may have some inherent stereotypic issues, the fact that American Eagle's powers come from a non-ethnically based source (and not, say, the Great Spirit) marks a significant improvement for Indigenous characters."

During an interview with Comic Book Resources, the assistant editor Lauren Sankovitch explains why she chose to represent American Eagle in Marvel Assistant-Sized Spectacular #1 (2009):

In an interview, Greg Pak, the writer of the story "Homeland" in War Machine (vol. 2) #6-7 (2010), told that Jason Strongbow, aka American Eagle, is easily his "favorite reinvented character of the past decade." Indeed, the modern character has undergone some transformations compared to its appearances from 1981 to 1994. At the beginning, the Navajo hero was wearing a stereotypical costume with feather headdress and buckskin boots. When the writer Warren Ellis and the artist Mike Deodato Jr. used the character in Thunderbolts, its new look is composed of ordinary clothes, a leather jacket and a helmet resembling the head and beak of a bald eagle. In its first appearances, Strongbow was running under his own power, at the opposite the new version uses a motorcycle.

Other characters named American Eagle

World War II
There was an American Eagle before Strongbow took the mantle. Lt. Col. James Fletcher, a renowned battlefield hero of World War I in recent times became the security chief and trainer for Project: Rebirth. He was captured by agents of the Red Skull (Johann Schmidt) and was tortured by the Master Interrogator. He refused to yield any information and committed suicide to avoid breaking under further torture. First appeared in Adventures of Captain America #1 (September 1991) and appeared through to issue #3 (December 1991) which depicted his death.

Earth-712
There have also been two incarnations of characters named the American Eagle in the Squadron Supreme:

 The first being Johnathon James Dore Senior, who was a member of the Golden Agency and a founding member of the Squadron Supreme. He is also the father of Blue Eagle. He first appeared in Squadron Supreme #1 (September 1985).
 The second incarnation, is the son of the original Squadron's American Eagle. The character debuted as a member of the team of superheroes called the Squadron Supreme in The Avengers #85 (February 1971) as American Eagle, then as Cap'n Hawk in The Avengers #148 (June 1976), and finally as Blue Eagle in Squadron Supreme #1 (September 1985).

References

External links
 
 
 Jason Strongbow (Earth-616) at Marvel Comics Database

Comics characters introduced in 1981
Fictional characters from Arizona
Fictional archers
Fictional Navajo people
Fictional Native American people
Marvel Comics characters who can move at superhuman speeds
Marvel Comics characters with superhuman senses
Marvel Comics characters with superhuman strength
Marvel Comics mutates
Marvel Comics male superheroes
United States-themed superheroes
Characters created by Doug Moench